Felicity Kendall Huffman (born December 9, 1962) is an American actress.

Huffman began her acting career in theatre, and in the 1990s also had many supporting roles in film and television. She starred as Dana Whitaker in the comedy-drama Sports Night from 1998 to 2000, which earned her a Golden Globe Award nomination. She is best known for her role as Lynette Scavo in the ABC comedy-drama Desperate Housewives (2004–2012), for which she earned the Primetime Emmy Award for Outstanding Lead Actress in a Comedy Series for the debut season of the series, three Screen Actors Guild Awards, and three consecutive Golden Globe nominations.

Huffman drew critical praise for her performance as a transgender woman in the independent film Transamerica (2005). The role earned her a Golden Globe Award, Independent Spirit Award, National Board of Review, and an Academy Award nomination for Best Actress. Huffman has also starred in such films as Reversal of Fortune (1990), The Spanish Prisoner (1997), Magnolia (1999), Path to War (2002), Georgia Rule (2007), Phoebe in Wonderland (2008), Rudderless (2014), and Cake (2014). From 2015 to 2017, she starred in a third ABC series, the anthology crime drama American Crime, for which she received critical acclaim including three Primetime Emmy Award nominations, two Golden Globe nominations and a Screen Actors Guild nomination.

Huffman was arrested on March 12, 2019, for her involvement with a nationwide college entrance exam cheating scandal. Charged with conspiracy to commit mail fraud and honest services mail fraud, she was released on $250,000 bail. On May 13, she pleaded guilty to federal charges for paying $15,000 to have a proctor correct SAT questions answered incorrectly by her daughter. On September 13, she was sentenced to 14 days in prison, a $30,000 fine, 250 hours of community service and one year supervised release for her part in the scandal.

Early life and education
Huffman was born in Bedford, New York, into a wealthy family, the daughter of Grace Valle (née Ewing) and Moore Peters Huffman, a banker and partner at Morgan Stanley. Her parents divorced a year after her birth, and she was raised by both of them. When Huffman was a young teenager, she discovered that her biological father was Roger Tallman Maher, who was a family friend. She has six sisters and a brother. In the 1970s, Huffman's mother left New York and bought property in Snowmass, Colorado, where Felicity and her siblings spent their youth. Her great-grandfather was Gershom Moore Peters, founder of the Peters Cartridge Company and prominent Baptist minister, author of The Master. Her other great-grandfather, Frederick Berthold Ewing, graduated from Yale University and became a prominent St. Louis businessman. Huffman's great-great-grandfather was Joseph Warren King, founder of the King Mills Powder Company. She has German, English, Scots-Irish, Scottish, French-Canadian, and Irish ancestry.

Huffman attended The Putney School, a private boarding high school in Putney, Vermont, and graduated from Interlochen Arts Academy in Michigan in 1981. She attended New York University, Circle in the Square Theatre School and the Royal Academy of Dramatic Art in London, England.

Career

Early career
Huffman made her debut on stage in 1982 and in the 1980s and 1990s worked as a rule on stage productions. In 1988, she debuted on Broadway in the role as Karen in David Mamet's play Speed the Plow. In 1995, Huffman won Obie Award for her performance in the play The Cryptogram by David Mamet. In 1999 she starred in the premiere of David Mamet's play Boston Marriage, about the daringly intimate relationship between two turn-of-the-century women, as well as in several other major theatrical productions.

1991–2003: Earliest television and film roles

Huffman debuted on the big screen in 1988 with a small role in Mamet's film Things Change. Two years later, she appeared as Minnie, a Harvard law school student in the courtroom drama Reversal of Fortune. Her other credits include 1992 thriller Quicksand: No Escape with Donald Sutherland and Tim Matheson, The Water Engine opposite William H. Macy, and supporting roles on The Heart of Justice (1992), Hackers (1995), Harrison: Cry of the City (1996) and The Underworld (1997).

Huffman starred on the television mini-series Golden Years, based on the novel by Stephen King in 1991. In 1994, she starred in the ABC pilot Thunder Alley as Ed Asner's daughter, but was replaced in subsequent episodes by Diane Venora when the series began. During the 1990s, she appeared mostly in guest roles on such shows as  The X-Files, Early Edition, Chicago Hope and Law & Order. In 1997, she starred in Mamet's film The Spanish Prisoner.

From 1998 to 2000, she portrayed Dana Whitaker in the series Sports Night, for which she received several awards and nominations, including a Golden Globe Award for Best Actress – Television Series Musical or Comedy. After the completion of Sports Night, she gave birth to her first child and soon returned to work. In 2001, she starred on the not picked up CBS pilot Heart Department In 2003, she starred in Showtime's miniseries Out of Order.

In 1999, she appeared in the Paul Thomas Anderson's ensemble drama Magnolia and television adaptation of 1938 movie A Slight Case of Murder along with William H. Macy. In 2002 she played Lady Bird Johnson in the HBO award-winning movie Path to War and made a cameo appearance in Door to Door, which starred, and was written by, her husband. She also starred in Snap Decision (2001) with Mare Winningham, Raising Helen (2004) as Kate Hudson's character's older sister, and Christmas with the Kranks (2004), as the best friend of Jamie Lee Curtis's character.

2004–2012: Desperate Housewives and Transamerica

After a recurring role on the NBC sitcom Frasier, Huffman landed a leading role in an ABC comedy series Desperate Housewives, co-starring with Marcia Cross, Teri Hatcher, and Eva Longoria. Huffman won an Emmy Award for her work on Desperate Housewives (Outstanding Lead Actress in a Comedy Series) in 2005, as well as two 2006 Screen Actors Guild Awards (Best Actress - Comedy Series and part of Best Ensemble - Comedy Series) in 2006 and received several other awards. A report in November 2010 suggested that Huffman, along with co-star Teri Hatcher, would be quitting Desperate Housewives, but ABC denied the claim. The series ended in May 2012, after eight seasons.

In 2005, Huffman starred in the independent drama Transamerica, playing Bree, a pre-operative transgender woman who, on the brink of her transforming surgery, discovered that in her youth she had fathered a son - who is now a troubled teen hustler on the run. Huffman's performance in Transamerica was praised by many critics and garnered her a Golden Globe Award for Best Actress, as well as nominations for Best Actress (Screen Actors Guild) and Best Actress (Academy Awards), and several  other awards and nominations. Huffman is now a voting member of the Academy of Motion Picture Arts and Sciences.

In 2007, Huffman starred in Garry Marshall's Georgia Rule with Jane Fonda and Lindsay Lohan, and 2008 on independent drama Phoebe in Wonderland. She made a film, Lesster, as a writer, director and actress in 2010.

2013–present: Subsequent career and American Crime
Huffman said that after seeing her as Lynette Scavo on Housewives for eight years it was difficult for audiences to think of her as anything else. She said that's why she was eager for a role that's a distinctive departure. After Desperate Housewives finale, Huffman reunited with playwright David Mamet in the comedy play November. The play debuted on September 26 and ended on November 4, 2012. In 2012, she also appeared in the ensemble cast independent movie, Trust Me, opposite Clark Gregg.

On February 15, 2013, Huffman signed on for the lead role of the Fox drama pilot Boomerang, directed by Craig Brewer. The show centers on Margie Hamilton, a spy and master of disguise, who is the matriarch of the Hamilton clan, a "briskly professional assassin who can kill and dispose of a suspected terrorist in the afternoon – then switch to wife and mother mode without a hitch". However, Fox did not pick up Boomerang as a new series.

In 2013, Huffman starred in the independent drama Rudderless, and in the adventure film Big Game opposite Samuel L. Jackson. She also starred in another independent drama Stealing Cars, and was cast in the comedy film Zendog. In April 2014 she appeared in the independent film Cake opposite Jennifer Aniston.In 2014, Huffman was cast as the lead in the ABC anthology legal drama pilot American Crime created by John Ridley. The pilot was picked up to series in May 2014. On October 2, 2014, it was announced that Huffman would be star and executive producer alongside Carol Mendelsohn in her untitled drama about a special agent (Huffman) who is the fearless leader of a team of young agents on the New York City Joint Terrorism Task Force. The project was developed for ABC, but was not green-lighted for 2015–16 television season. American Crime debuted on ABC in March, 2015 and Huffman received critical acclaim for her performance as an antagonistic character. Robert Bianco from USA Today said in his review "A triumph for Oscar winner John Ridley, who created, produced and directed American Crime, and a reconfirmation that Felicity Huffman is one of the best actors we have... In no case is that truer than with Huffman's Barb, who is the morally questionable center of the story. Barb is a Lifetime movie heroine: a tough, divorced mother who raised her children alone, and is fighting now to bring her son's murderer to justice. Except this isn't that kind of show, and Barb's battles have not just made her stronger; they've made her hate all the people she's felt she had to fight. Which is why Huffman's gut-wrenching performance is so startling. A bundle of barely concealed fury, Huffman forces us to invest in a woman who thinks her bigotry makes her not just right, but noble."

In 2018, Huffman starred in the second season of the Epix comedy-drama Get Shorty.

In 2019, Huffman starred in two Netflix projects: the Ava DuVernay miniseries When They See Us about the famous Central Park jogger case from 1989 in which a jogger was attacked in Central Park in New York City and in the comedy-drama film Otherhood based on the novel Whatever Makes You Happy by William Sutcliffe, She also starred in the drama film Tammy's Always Dying directed by Amy Jo Johnson. which had its world premiere at the Toronto International Film Festival in September 2019.

In November 2020, it was reported that Huffman would star in an ABC comedy television series pertaining to minor league baseball. As of December 2022, no further announcements on this project had been made.

Personal life

Huffman dated actor William H. Macy on and off for 15 years before they married on September 6, 1997. They have two daughters, Sophia and Georgia. She has appeared on television, in movies and on stage many times with her husband. The couple each received a star on the Hollywood Walk of Fame on March 7, 2012.

In 2005, Huffman revealed that she had suffered from both anorexia and bulimia in her late teens and twenties.

Huffman is the co-author of the self-help book A Practical Handbook for the Boyfriend. On March 1, 2012, Huffman launched What The Flicka, a website dedicated to women and mothers where she was a regular contributor. In March 2019, the website was reportedly deactivated.

In 2016, Huffman voiced support for Hillary Rodham Clinton in the 2016 U.S. presidential election. In 2018, Huffman donated $400 to Kamala Harris's campaign in the 2020 U.S. presidential election.

Felicity Huffman has been a member of the Academy of Motion Picture Arts and Sciences in the Actors Branch since 2006.

Involvement in 2019 college admissions bribery scandal

Huffman was among dozens charged by the FBI and IRS and U.S. Attorney's Office on March 12, 2019 in a nationwide college entrance exam cheating scandal. Prosecutors alleged that Huffman's $15,000 donation to the Key Worldwide Foundation, ostensibly a charitable contribution, was in fact payment to someone who posed as Huffman's daughter Sophia to take the SAT, receiving a score that showed significant improvement over Sophia's score on the Preliminary SAT (PSAT). Huffman was arrested at her California home on March 12, 2019 by FBI agents and IRS agents and charged with conspiracy to commit mail fraud and honest services fraud. She appeared on March 13, 2019 in Los Angeles Federal Court, where federal agents took her passport and the court released her on $250,000 bail. At her court appearance in Boston on April 3, 2019, she acknowledged her rights, charges and maximum possible penalties then waived a pretrial hearing, signed conditions of her release and was allowed to leave. On April 8, 2019, she agreed to plead guilty to one count of conspiracy to commit mail fraud and honest services mail fraud.

Huffman formally pled guilty to honest services fraud on May 13, 2019. On September 13, 2019, she was sentenced to 14 days in jail and one year of supervised release, fined $30,000 and ordered to do 250 hours of community service. She reported to the Federal Correctional Institution in Dublin, California on October 15, 2019 to begin her sentence. She was released on October 25, 2019, two days early, because October 27 fell on a weekend. As of October 2020, when Huffman completed her full sentence, no charges have been filed against her husband and Sophia's father, actor and director William H. Macy.

Credits

Film

Television

Theatre

Honors
 1998: Honored with the Grand Jury Award – Comedy (Performance) by the US Comedy Arts Festival.
2005: Best Actress Award - San Diego Film Festival
 2012: Inducted into the Hollywood Walk of Fame receiving a star for her contribution to Television — received the 2,463rd star located at 7072 Hollywood, Blvd.

References

External links

 What The Flicka
 
 
 Felicity Huffman at Internet Off-Broadway Database
 

1962 births
Living people
20th-century American actresses
21st-century American actresses
Actresses from Michigan
Actresses from New York (state)
Actresses from Vermont
Alumni of RADA
American film actresses
American abortion-rights activists
American stage actresses
American television actresses
Best Drama Actress Golden Globe (film) winners
Circle in the Square Theatre School alumni
Independent Spirit Award for Best Female Lead winners
New York (state) Democrats
Obie Award recipients
Outstanding Performance by a Lead Actress in a Comedy Series Primetime Emmy Award winners
Outstanding Performance by a Female Actor in a Comedy Series Screen Actors Guild Award winners
American people convicted of fraud
People from Grand Traverse County, Michigan
People from Bedford, New York
People from Putney, Vermont
People from Windham County, Vermont
Tisch School of the Arts alumni
The Putney School alumni